Elections to Magherafelt District Council were held on 18 May 1977 on the same day as the other Northern Irish local government elections. The election used three district electoral areas to elect a total of 15 councillors.

Election results

Note: "Votes" are the first preference votes.

Districts summary

|- class="unsortable" align="centre"
!rowspan=2 align="left"|Ward
! % 
!Cllrs
! % 
!Cllrs
! %
!Cllrs
! %
!Cllrs
! % 
!Cllrs
! % 
!Cllrs
!rowspan=2|TotalCllrs
|- class="unsortable" align="center"
!colspan=2 bgcolor="" | SDLP
!colspan=2 bgcolor="" | UUP
!colspan=2 bgcolor="" | DUP
!colspan=2 bgcolor="" | RC
!colspan=2 bgcolor="" | UUUP
!colspan=2 bgcolor="white"| Others
|-
|align="left"|Area A
|bgcolor="#99FF66"|47.8
|bgcolor="#99FF66"|2
|26.2
|2
|10.0
|0
|17.0
|1
|0.0
|0
|0.0
|0
|5
|-
|align="left"|Area B
|21.5
|1
|bgcolor="40BFF5"|24.5
|bgcolor="40BFF5"|2
|14.8
|1
|9.1
|0
|10.1
|1
|20.0
|1
|5
|-
|align="left"|Area C
|bgcolor="#99FF66"|36.5
|bgcolor="#99FF66"|2
|10.2
|1
|31.4
|2
|0.0
|0
|8.4
|0
|13.5
|0
|5
|-
|- class="unsortable" class="sortbottom" style="background:#C9C9C9"
|align="left"| Total
|35.1
|5
|20.1
|4
|18.7
|3
|8.5
|1
|6.3
|1
|11.3
|1
|15
|-
|}

Districts results

Area A

1973: 3 x SDLP, 1 x UUP, 1 x Republican Clubs
1977: 2 x SDLP, 2 x UUP, 1 x Republican Clubs
1973-1977 Change: UUP gain from SDLP

Area B

1973: 2 x UUP, 1 x SDLP, 1 x Vanguard, 1 x Independent Nationalist
1977: 1 x UUP, 1 x SDLP, 1 x DUP, 1 x UUUP, 1 x Independent Nationalist
1973-1977 Change: DUP and UUUP gain from UUP and Vanguard

Area C

1973: 2 x SDLP, 2 x UUP, 1 x United Loyalist
1977: 2 x SDLP, 2 x DUP, 1 x UUP
1973-1977 Change: DUP gain from UUP, United Loyalist joins DUP

References

Magherafelt District Council elections
Magherafelt